Holothuria (Selenkothuria) glaberrima, also known as the brown rock sea cucumber, is a species of sea cucumber in the genus Holothuria, subgenus Selenkothuria. The cucumber is distributed in the Western Atlantic Ocean, the Caribbean Sea, and the Gulf of Mexico. The species is found at a depth of 0–42 meters.

Description
The body of Holothuria glaberrima is cigar-shaped, with a whorl of twenty bushy feeding tentacles at the anterior end surrounding the mouth. The cuticle is leathery and tough; the dorsal surface is smooth, while the ventral surface or "sole" bears three longitudinal rows of dark brown tube feet. The general colour is blackish, dark brown or occasionally grey, without any spots, while the tentacles are black.

Distribution and habitat
Holothuria glaberrima is native to the tropical western Atlantic Ocean, the Caribbean Sea and the Gulf of Mexico; its range includes the West Indies. Florida, Mexico, Honduras, Nicaragua, Costa Rica, Panama, Colombia, Venezuela, Guyana, Suriname, French Guiana and Brazil. It lives under rocks in areas with considerable water movement.

Research
Sea cucumbers are able to regenerate their complete digestive systems and grow back most parts of the body following injury. Because of this, and because of the closeness of the relationship of echinoderms to vertebrates, sea cucumbers have been used in regeneration research. Holothuria glaberrima has been widely used as a model organism for this purpose, and to facilitate these studies, the genome has been sequenced.

References 

Holothuriidae
Fauna of the Atlantic Ocean
Animals described in 1867